The Gurktal Alps is a mountain range located in the Central Eastern Alps in Austria, named after the valley of the Gurk river. The range stretches west to Lake Millstatt and east to Neumarkter Sattel (north-northwest of Neumarkt in der Steiermark). The highest peak is the Styrian Eisenhut at 2,441m (8,009 ft).

Geography

Location 
The range is located between the Mur Valley in the north, separating it from the Niedere Tauern, and the Drava in the south, where it borders on the Gailtal Alps and Karavanke ranges of the Southern Limestone Alps. In the west, the Gurktal Alps reach up to the Katschberg Pass and the Ankogel Group of the Hohe Tauern range. In the east, the Neumarkt Pass in Upper Styria separates it from the adjacent Lavanttal Alps.

Subdivisions 
The Gurktal Alps may be divided into five subgroups:

 The Nock Mountains lie between the Liesertal and Flattnitzer Höhe. Their highest peak is the Eisenhut (2,441 m).
 The Metnitz Mountains lie between the Mur and Metnitz valleys. Their highest point is the Goldachnock (2,171 m).
 The Mödring Chain lies between the Metnitz and Gurktal valleys. Its highest point is the Dorferecken (1,726 m)
 The Wimitz Mountains lie between the Gurk and Glan valleys through which flows the Wimitz river. Their highest peaks are the Schneebauerberg and the Hocheck (both 1,338 m)

At the southern end of the Gurktal Alps is the Klagenfurt Basin. Here there are seven more smaller mountain chains:

 Magdalensberg (Lippekogel, 1,079 m)
 Ossiach Tauern (Taubenbühel 1,069 m)
 Glantal Highlands (Ulrichsberg, 1,022 m)
 Sattnitz (Tanzboden, 929 m)
 Feldkirchen-Moosburg Upland (Freudenberg, 817 m)
 St. Veit Upland (Buchberg, 808 m)
 Maria Saal Upland (Maria Saaler Berg, 746 m)

The Gurktal Alps are, along with the Lavanttal Alps to the east, are occasionally classified as part of the Noric Alps. However, it is not geologically justified.

Peaks 
The highest peaks are located within the Nock Mountains (Nockberge, from Nock meaning "rounded hilltop", cf. Nockerl) subgroup west of Flattnitz Pass, including Mt. Eisenhut, in Styria. The Nationalpark Nockberge along the scenic Nockalm Road in Carinthia since 1987 is a protected landscape area (IUCN V). The Nock Mountains also stretch down to major Carinthian lakes like Millstätter See and Ossiacher See.

Other peaks include:

 Großer Rosennock,  
 Hohe Pressing,  
 Rinsennock,

Geology 
The Gurktal Alps consist mainly of three tectonic plates: at the bottom, the "mica schist plate", above it, the "Murau plate" and at the top, the "Stolzalpen plate". 

The lowest plate is made of mica schist, the one in the middle is made of greenstone slates, phyllite and marble. The highest plate, the Stolzalpen plate, consists of slates of originally similar age, but which have been transformed less and now appear as clay slates, Volcanic rocks and limestone.

Economy and tourism

The landscape has numerous mountain pastures and had been the site of transhumance agriculture. The Gurktal Alps were also a mining area for iron and silver. Magnesite deposits are continued to be exploited near Radenthein.

Today, tourism is the most important economic sector. The valleys of the Gurktal Alps cater for tourists in summer and for the winter season. The leading tourist area is  Bad Kleinkirchheim, then Turracher Höhe (Predlitz-Turrach and Reichenau), Falkert (Reichenau) and Innerkrems (Krems in Kärnten), Flattnitz, Afritz and Katschberg (Rennweg am Katschberg). The largest ski areas are Katschberg-Aineck, Innerkrems-Schönfeld-Karneralm, Turracher Höhe and Gerlitzen in the Nock Mountains and Kreischberg in the Metnitz Mountains.

The Nock Mountain region is well known for its spas. The Karlbad along the Nockalmstraße is the oldest farmers' healing spring in Austria. The method of creating the baths (with spring water and hot rocks), has remained unchanged since the 17th century. Their location means there is no electricity. The name of the spa is derived from the little cirque (Karl from Kar, cirque).

References

 http://www.summitpost.org/gurktal-alps-rockberge/153224

Central Alps
Mountain ranges of Carinthia (state)